The 15th Emmy Awards Ceremony, later known as the 15th Primetime Emmy Awards, were handed out on May 26, 1963.  The ceremony was hosted by Annette Funicello and Don Knotts.  Winners are listed in bold and series' networks are in parentheses.

The top shows of the night were The Defenders and The Dick Van Dyke Show. Each won for series, directing, and writing in their respective genres. The Defenders led the night in major wins (4) and nominations (7).

Winners and nominees

Programs

Acting

Lead performances

Supporting performances

Single performances

Directing

Writing

Most major nominations
By network 
 CBS – 34
 NBC – 30
 ABC – 23

 By program
 Alcoa Premiere (ABC) / The Defenders (CBS) – 7
 The Dick Van Dyke Show (CBS) / Hallmark Hall of Fame (NBC) – 6
 Ben Casey (ABC) / The Beverly Hillbillies (CBS) / Naked City (ABC) / The DuPont Show of the Week (NBC) – 4

Most major awards
By network 
 CBS – 9
 NBC – 7
 ABC – 2

 By program
 The Defenders (CBS) – 4
 The Dick Van Dyke Show (CBS) – 3
 The Tunnel (NBC) / Ben Casey (ABC) – 2

Notes

References

External links
 
 
 Emmys.com list of 1963 Nominees & Winners
 

015
Primetime Emmy Awards
Primetime Emmy Awards
Primetime Emmy
Primetime Emmy Awards